High Finance may refer to:
 High Finance (Dad's Army), a 1975 episode of the British comedy series Dad's Army
 High Finance (TV series), a 1956 American quiz show
 High Finance (film), a 1933 British drama film